Huam-dong is a dong, neighbourhood of Yongsan-gu in Seoul, South Korea.

Education 
 Seoul Samkwang Elementary School
 Seoul Huam Elementary School

See also 
Administrative divisions of South Korea

References

External links
 Yongsan-gu official website
 Yongsan-gu official website
 Huam-dong resident office website

Neighbourhoods of Yongsan District